Pamyatnaya knizhka Memorial Book Памятная книжка is the title of official reference books of regions and towns in Russian empire.

History 
The books were annually published by local authorities in 89 gubernias and regions of Russian Empire starting from the mid-1830s till 1917. They provide information on population and businesses in the course of over 60 years. Over two thousand books have been found.

Composition of Pamyatnaya knizhka 
The books had some peculiarities in some gubernias and not always comprised 4 main sections:
 address-calendar (index of all local official institutions and their staff),
 administrative reference book (information on administrative units in a gubernia, post offices, roads, industrial and commercial enterprises, hospitals and chemists', educational institutions, museums and libraries, book stores and print shops, periodicals, list of towns, major landowners etc.),
 statistic data (statistic tables on population, farming, education, incomes, fires etc.);
 historical background.

Research project 
The Russian National Library is carrying out a research project devoted to Pamyatnaya knizhka. The project is supervised by Mrs. Nadezhda Balatskaya Надежда Михайловна Балацкая in the department Bibliografia and krayevedeniye of the Russian National Library.
The project comprises official memorial books Pamyatnay knizhkas of all gubernias and regions of Russia, including areas that are no longer within the Russian Federation.
The main result of the project will be the publication of 15 volume bibliographic index book titled "Памятные книжки губерний и областей Российской империи: Указатель содержания". Some of materials in work are available at national computer center. Рабочие материалы проекта представляют огромный интерес для людей, занимающихся генеалогией. That is an important source for genealogic researchers.

External links
 the site of the project of the Russia’s National Library «Памятные книжки губерний и областей Российской империи»
 some memorial books of Russian Empire in pdf at Russian national computer center
 Memorial books of some gubernias

Russian Empire
Directories
Genealogy publications